Wesley Lieberher (born April 1, 1979) is an American executive chef, known for his work with Beer Belly and Whiz in Los Angeles. Lieberher is also frontman of national music act Kill Verona. He has appeared on Travel Channel's Food Paradise, Food Network's Diners, Drive-Ins, and Dives, Esquire Network's Knife Fight, ABC's The Taste, and multiple other food network shows. His son is the actor Jaeden Martell.

References

External links

American chefs
American male chefs
Living people
Place of birth missing (living people)
1979 births